Leslie Chauncey (born June 7, 1981) is an American professional basketball guard who plays for the Al Rayan SC Basketball Team in Qatar. Previously he played for several clubs in Germany, France and Hungary.

References

1981 births
Living people
Qatari men's basketball players
Qatari people of African-American descent
Point guards